Hydrothermal carbonization (HTC) (also referred to as "aqueous carbonization at elevated temperature and pressure") is a chemical process for the conversion of organic compounds to structured carbons. It can be used to make a wide variety of nanostructured carbons, simple production of brown coal substitute, synthesis gas, liquid petroleum precursors and humus from biomass with release of energy. Technically the process imitates, within a few hours, the brown coal formation process (German "Inkohlung"  literally "coalification") which takes place in nature over enormously longer geological time periods of 50,000 to 50 million years. It was investigated by Friedrich Bergius and first described in 1913.

Motivation
The carbon efficiency of most processes to convert organic matter to fuel is relatively low. I.e. the proportion of carbon contained in the biomass, which is later contained in the usable end product is relatively low:

 
In poorly designed systems, the unused carbon escapes into the atmosphere as carbon dioxide, or, when fermented, as methane. In addition, the heat which is released in these processes is not generally used. Advanced modern systems capture nearly all the gases and use the heat as part of the process or for district heating.

The problem with the production of biodiesel from oil plants is the fact that only the energy contained in the fruit can be used. If the entire plant could be used for fuel production, the energy yield could be increased by a factor of three to five with the same cultivation area when growing fast-growing plants such as willow, poplar, miscanthus, hemp, reeds or forestry, while simultaneously reducing energy, fertilizer and herbicide use, with the possibility of using - for current energy plant cultivation - poor soil. Hydrothermal carbonization makes it possible - similar to the biomass-to-liquid process - to use almost all of the carbon contained in the biomass for fuel generation.
It is a new variation of an old field (biomass conversion to biofuel) that has recently been further developed in Germany.  It involves moderate temperatures and pressures over an aqueous solution of biomass in a dilute acid for several hours. The resulting matter reportedly captures 100% of the carbon in a "biocoal" powder that could provide feedsource for soil amendment (similar to biochar) and further studies in economic nanomaterial production.

Process
During the reaction, oxonium ions are also formed which reduce the pH to pH 5 and lower. This step can be accelerated by adding a small amount of citric acid. In this case, at low pH values, more carbon passes into the aqueous phase. The effluent reaction is exothermic, that is, energy is released. After 12 hours, the carbon of the reactants is completely reacted, 90 to 99% of the carbon is present as an aqueous sludge of porous brown coal spheres (C6H2O) with pore sizes between 8 and 20 nm as a solid phase, the remaining 1 to 10% of carbon is either dissolved in the aqueous phase or converted to carbon dioxide. The reaction equation for the formation of brown coal is:

The reaction can be stopped in several stages with incomplete elimination of water, giving different intermediate products. After a few minutes, liquid intermediate lipophilic substances are formed, but their handling is very difficult because of their high reactivity. Subsequently, these substances polymerize and peat-like structures are formed, which are present as intermediates after about 8 hours.

Efficiency
As a result of the exothermic reaction of hydrothermal carbonization, about 3/8 of the calorific value of the biomass based on the dry mass is released (with a high lignin, resin and / or oil content at least 1/4). If the process is managed properly, it is possible to use this waste heat from wet biomass to produce dry biocoal and to use some of the converted energy for energy generation.

In a large-scale technical implementation of hydrothermal carbonization of sewage sludge, it has been shown that about 20% of the fuel energy content contained in 90% end-dried HTC coal is required to heat the process. Furthermore, approximately 5% of the generated energy content is necessary for electrical operation of the plant. It has proved particularly beneficial in the case of the HTC process that, with mechanical dehydration, more than 60% of the dry substance content can be achieved in the raw carbon, and thus the energy and equipment expenditure for the final drying of the coal is low compared to conventional drying methods of these slurries.

Compared to sludge digestion with subsequent drying, the energy requirement of the HTC is lower by approximately 20% of the electrical energy and approximately 70% of the thermal energy. The amount of energy produced by the HTC as a storable coal is simultaneously 10% higher. Compared to conventional thermal drying of sewage sludge, the HTC saves 62% of electricity and 69% of thermal energy due to its significantly simpler drainage.

Benefits
An exothermic process design would be advantageous in which the carbon content remains biologically, chemically or thermally convertible without further oxidation of the biomass. This could lead to a specific reduction in CO2 release .

According to Markus Antonietti, the most important point is "... that one has a simple method of transforming atmospheric CO2 via the detour of biomass into a stable and safe storage form, a carbon sink." With hydrothermal carbonization, as well as with other methods for the coking of biomass, a large quantity of carbon could be stored decently all over the world. Essentially safer than the currently discussed liquid or gaseous sequestration of carbon dioxide. With sufficient chemical stability of the coal, it could also be used very well for the improvement of soils (see also Terra preta).

The artificial humus could be used for the re- greening of eroded surfaces. Due to the increased plant growth in this way, additional carbon dioxide could be bound from the atmosphere so that a carbon efficiency of more than 1 or a negative CO2 balance could be achieved. The resulting carbon sludge could be used to burn or operate novel fuel cell types with a 60% efficiency, as currently being researched at Harvard University. In order to produce conventional fuels, the carbon-water mixture would have to be heated more intensively, so that so-called synthesis gas, a gas mixture of carbon monoxide and hydrogen, is formed:

This synthesis gas could be used to produce gasoline via the Fischer-Tropsch process. Alternatively, the liquid intermediates that are formed during the incomplete conversion of the biomass could be used for fuel and plastic production.

In addition, the resulting carbon mud can be briquetted and marketed as an environmentally friendly carbon dioxide-neutral "natural carbon" - Compared with the starting biomass, this can be dried by means of deposition or filtering or pressing with a lower energy consumption and, due to its higher energy content per volume or mass, reduce transport costs and require smaller storage areas.

An advantage of hydrothermal carbonization is that the usability of plant biomass is not restricted to plants with low moisture contents and the energy that can be obtained without carbon dioxide emission is not reduced by necessary drying measures or is usable directly for drying the end products. For example, even scarcely usable plant material, such as waste from gardens and urban green areas, can be used to produce energy, carbon dioxide is also being saved, which, together with even more climate-damaging methane, would otherwise be produced by bacterial conversion of the biomass.

In recent years HTC was applied as upstream conditioning technology for phosphorus recovery from sewage sludge with the benefit of higher yields.

Problems
The major problem in the production of synthesis gas from biomass is the formation of tar, which can be avoided during hydrothermal process management. However, it is not easy to see why this is the best way to process biocarbon.

An appropriate process management as well as problems in the collection, transportation and storage of accumulated biomass are unresolved in this problem. These processes also require energy, which should be less than is released by hydrothermal carbonation.

An advantage over dry thermal processes of refining biofuels with low moisture content is not so obvious. Even at the end of the 19th century, a weakly pyrolysed charcoal, which still contains at least 4/5 of the calorific value of the wood, was propagated for thermal processes.

Current application intentions 
The City of Mexico City presented the construction of a first HTC module for the conversion of 23.000 tons of organic waste per year in 2022. The plant is based on the TerraNova HTC technology and includes a pyrolysis plant to provide process heat to the HTC process.

In Phoenixville, Pennsylvania in the US, HTC will be used in the first municipally owned wastewater treatment in North America built by SoMax BioEnergy

In Mezzocorona (TN), Italy, the first HTC in the country was built in late 2019 by CarboREM and it is in service treating the digestate from an existent anaerobic digestion plant (AD). The AD is fed with sludge coming from regional based wineries and dairies. The slurry from HTC plant is then separated by a centrifuge, the HTC liquid is recirculating to the AD plant in order to produce more biogas and nearly 500 ton/y of hydrochar are produced. Subsequently, hydrochar is stabilized and processed by a third company as compost for the re-introduction in agricolture with a circular process.

In Relzow near Anklam (Mecklenburg-Western Pomerania), an HTC plant was officially inaugurated in the middle of November 2017 in  "Innovation Park Vorpommern". AVA is also the first company in the world to establish a HTC plant on industrial level in 2010.

In the Summer 2016, a HTC plant for the treatment of sewage sludge was put in operation in Jining/China to produce renewable fuel for the local coal fired power plant. According to the manufacturer TerraNova Energy, it is in continuous operation with an annual capacity of 14.000 tons.

See also
 Biomass
 Chernozem
  (only available in German)
  (only available in German)

External links 
Movie of commercial HTC installation by TerraNova Energy GmbH auf YouTube, retrieved 25 March 2019
Hydrothermale Carbonisierung HTC auf kompostverband.ch, retrieved 22 January 2017.
 Max-Planck-Gesellschaft: Zauberkohle aus dem Dampfkochtopf auf mpg.de, retrieved 22 January 2017.
 Chemical reactions under high pressure Vorlesung von Friedrich Bergius anlässlich der Verleihung des Nobelpreises 1931, (PDF-Datei; 781 kB), auf nobelprize.org, retrieved 22 January 2017.
 Kraftstoff aus Orangen auf sueddeutsche.de, retrieved 22 January 2017.
 Weiterführende Informationen zum AVA-HTC-Reaktor mit interessanter Diskussion auf ithaka-journal.net, retrieved 22 January 2017.
 Official launch of the AVA HTC plant in Relzow November, 2017
 In 2010, AVA became the first company in the world to operate a HTC plant on an industrial scale  In 2010
 The TerraNova®ultra process mimics and significantly accelerates the process of natural coal formation 
 Hydrothermal Carbonization of Sludge Residues via Carborem C700 industrial Scale Continuous Operating Plant

Literature 
 Tobias Helmut Freitag: Hydrothermale Karbonisierung. Studienarbeit, Grin, 2011, .
 X. J. Cui, M. Antonietti, S. H. Yu: Structural effects of iron oxide nanoparticles and iron ions on the hydrothermal carbonization of starch and rice carbohydrates. In: Small. 2 (6): 756–759, 2006.
 S. H. Yu,  X. J. Cui, L. L. Li, K. Li, B. Yu, M. Antonietti, H. Colfen: From starch to metal/carbon hybrid nanostructures: Hydrothermal metal-catalyzed carbonization. In: Advanced Materials. 16 (18): 1636, 2004.

References

Biofuels technology
Biomass